Alexander Assefa (born 1983) is an American politician and former member of the Nevada Assembly from the 42nd district.

Early life
Assefa was born in Dodola, Ethiopia in 1983. He earned a B.A. in political science from Averett University in Danville, Virginia.

Career
Assefa is a licensed pilot. Assefa also worked as a political advisor for the Ethiopian Community Center of Las Vegas. In 2018, Assefa was elected to the Nevada Assembly, where he has been representing the 42nd district since November 7, 2018. Assefa is a Democrat. Assefa resigned from the legislature on January 11, 2021, amidst investigation over campaign finances.

The Clark County Commission appointed Tracy Brown-May to serve the remainder of the term.

Criminal charges
In May 2020, during an investigation, law enforcement raided Assefa's house. On March 17, 2021, Assefa faced fourteen criminal charges filed by the Nevada Attorney General's office in the Las Vegas Justice Court. These criminal charges include false information about his residency on campaign expense and voter registration documents as well as thousands of dollars in theft.

Personal life
Assefa is married to Zenash Mebratu.

References

Living people
1983 births
Ethiopian emigrants to the United States
Averett University alumni
Democratic Party members of the Nevada Assembly
African-American state legislators in Nevada
21st-century American politicians
21st-century African-American politicians
20th-century African-American people
American people of Ethiopian descent